Ignatius 'Ig' Michael Prinsloo (born ) is a South African rugby union player for the  in the Pro14 . His regular position is prop.

He signed for the Kings Pro14 side for the 2019–20 Pro14.

References

South African rugby union players
Living people
1997 births
Rugby union props
Southern Kings players
Blue Bulls players
Pumas (Currie Cup) players